This article details the Huddersfield Giants rugby league football club's 2013 season. This was the 18th season of the Super League era.

Pre season friendlies

Giants score is first.

Player appearances
Friendly Games Only

 = Injured

 = Suspended

Table

2013 fixtures and results

2013 Engage Super League

Player appearances
Super League Only

 = Injured

 = Suspended

Challenge Cup

Player appearances
Challenge Cup Games only

Playoffs

Player appearances
Play-off Games only

2013 squad statistics

 Appearances and points include (Super League, Challenge Cup and Play-offs) as of 28 September 2013.

 = Injured
 = Suspended

Out of contract 2013

Players out of contract in 2013:

2013 transfers in/out

In

Out

References

External links
Huddersfield on Sky Sports
Huddersfield on Super League Site
BBC Sport-Rugby League

Huddersfield Giants seasons
Huddersfield Giants